Hemiptocha chalcostomus is a moth in the family Crambidae. It was described by Harrison Gray Dyar Jr. in 1916. It is found in Mexico.

References

Chiloini
Moths described in 1916